Wushu was contested by both men and women at the 2013 Southeast Asian Games at Wunna Theikdi Indoor Stadium, Naypyidaw, Myanmar between December 7–10.

Medal summary

Medal table

Medalists

Men's taolu

Men's sanshou

Women's taolu

Women's sanshou

Results

Men's taolu

Duilian (2 or 3 athletes With Weapon)
December 7

Duilian (2 or 3 athletes Bare Hands)
December 8

Changquan
December 7

Nanquan
December 8

Nangun
December 10

Nandao
December 9

Taijiquan
 Taijiquan — December 7
 Taijijian — December 10

Daoshu
December 9

Gunshu
December 8

Men's sanshou

48 kg

52 kg

56 kg

Women's taolu

Duilian (2 or 3 athletes Bare Hands)
December 9

Duilian (2 or 3 athletes With Weapon)
December 10

Changquan
December 8

Nanquan
December 7

Nandao
December 8

Nangun
December 9

Taijiquan
 Taijiquan — December 7
 Taijijian — December 8

Jianshu
December 7

Quiangshu
December 9

Women's sanshou

48 kg

52 kg

References

2013 Southeast Asian Games events
2013
2013 in wushu (sport)